Eta Virginis (η Virginis, abbreviated Eta Vir, η Vir) is a triple star system in the zodiac constellation of Virgo. It has a combined apparent visual magnitude of 3.89, bright enough to be seen with the naked eye in dark skies.

The system consists of a binary pair designated Eta Virginis A together with a third companion, Eta Virginis B. A's two components are themselves designated Eta Virginis Aa (officially named Zaniah , the traditional name of the system) and Ab.

Nomenclature

η Virginis (Latinised to Eta Virginis) is the system's Bayer designation. The designations of the two constituents as Eta Virginis A and those of A'scomponents - Eta Virginis Aa and Ab - derive from the convention used by the Washington Multiplicity Catalog (WMC) for multiple star systems, and adopted by the International Astronomical Union (IAU).

It bore the traditional name Zaniah , derived from the Arabic زاوية zāwiyah "corner", the same source as Zavijava (Beta Virginis). In 2016, the IAU organized a Working Group on Star Names (WGSN) to catalogue and standardize proper names for stars. The WGSN decided to attribute proper names to individual stars rather than entire multiple systems. It approved the name Zaniah for the component Eta Virginis Aa on 12 September 2016 and it is now so included in the List of IAU-approved Star Names.

In the catalogue of stars in the Calendarium of Al Achsasi Al Mouakket, this star was designated Thanih al Aoua, which was translated into Latin as Secunda Latratoris, meaning "the second barker". This star, along with Beta Virginis (Zavijava), Gamma Virginis (Porrima), Delta Virginis (Minelauva) and Epsilon Virginis (Vindemiatrix), were Al ʽAwwāʼ, "the Barker".

Properties

Eta Virginis looks single, but lunar occultations have shown it to be a very close triple star system consisting of two stars 0.6 AU apart, assuming a distance of 91 parsecs, with a third slightly more distant star. The inner pair is a spectroscopic binary that completes an orbit in 72 days. The inclination of this orbit was determined through interferometer observations to be 45.5°, allowing the masses of the two stars to be estimated. The primary star, Eta Virginis Aa, has a mass about 2.5 times the Sun's mass, while the secondary, Eta Virginis Ab, has 1.9 solar masses. The faint tertiary star, Eta Virginis B, orbits the inner group in a wider orbit over a period of 13.1 years.

Eta Virginis is 1.97 degrees north of the ecliptic, so it can be occulted by the Moon and (rarely) by planets. On October 12, 272 BC the ancient Greek astronomer Timocharis observed a conjunction of the star with Venus. The last occultation by a planet took place on September 27, 1843, also by Venus, which will occult it again on November 19, 2445.

Two degrees north-following of Eta Virginis is SS Virginis, a typical Cool Carbon Star and one of the most red colored stars in the equatorial sky.

References

External links 
Zaniah

Virginis, Eta
Virgo (constellation)
Triple star systems
A-type main-sequence stars
Zaniah
Virginis, 015
060129
4689
107259
Durchmusterung objects